Exactly Right Podcast Network is an American podcast network founded by Georgia Hardstark and Karen Kilgariff in 2018. It produces 16 podcasts including My Favorite Murder which Hardstark and Kilgariff have co-hosted since 2016.

History

 
The creation of the network was announced on August 15, 2018., and officially launched on November 28, 2018 with five podcasts: My Favorite Murder, Do You Need A Ride?, This Podcast Will Kill You, The Purrrcast, and The Fall Line.

The network signed a two-year deal with Stitcher in 2019, which The Wall Street Journal estimated to be worth $10 million. As part of the deal, Sticher provided additional funding, advertising, and development tools to the network, and set the plan to create over a dozen more podcasts.

In 2021 four additional podcasts were launched on the Network: Beauty podcast The True Beauty Brooklyn Podcast which is hosted by two estheticians, true crime podcast Tenfold More Wicked Presents: Wicked Words (sequel to author Kate Winkler Dawson's original podcast Tenfold More Wicked), parenting podcast Parent Footprint with Dr. Dan, and limited series Waiting for Impact hosted by Dave Holmes.

In 2022, Exactly Right Media signed an ad sales and distribution agreement with Amazon and Wondery. Under the agreement, episodes of shows such as My Favorite Murder and This Podcast Will Kill You are available a week early in Amazon Music and Wondery+.

Podcasts

Current podcasts

Former podcasts

References

External links 
 Official website

Podcasting companies
American companies established in 2018
Mass media companies established in 2018